The Garlic Ballads is a 1988 novel by Nobel Prize–winning author Mo Yan. When it was published in the 1980s it was banned in China. The book is about the 1987 garlic glut.

References 

1988 Chinese novels
Novels by Mo Yan